William Hewer (7 May 1877 – 2 June 1948) was an Australian cricketer. He played in seven first-class matches for South Australia between 1898 and 1911.

See also
 List of South Australian representative cricketers

References

External links
 

1877 births
1948 deaths
Australian cricketers
South Australia cricketers
Cricketers from Adelaide